In sports analytics, sabermetrics (originally SABRmetrics) is the empirical analysis of baseball, especially baseball statistics that measure in-game activity. Sabermetricians collect and summarize the relevant data from this in-game activity to answer specific questions. The term is derived from the acronym SABR, which stands for the Society for American Baseball Research, founded in 1971. The term "sabermetrics" was coined by Bill James, who is one of its pioneers and is often considered its most prominent advocate and public face.

Early history 

Henry Chadwick, a sportswriter in New York, developed the box score in 1858. This was the first way statisticians were able to describe the sport of baseball by numerically tracking various aspects of game play. The creation of the box score has given baseball statisticians a summary of the individual and team performances for a given game.

Sabermetrics research began in the middle of the 20th century with the writings of Earnshaw Cook, one of the earliest sabermetricians. Cook's 1964 book Percentage Baseball was one of the first of its kind. At first, most organized baseball teams and professionals dismissed Cook's work as meaningless. The idea of a science of baseball statistics began to achieve legitimacy in 1977 when Bill James began releasing Baseball Abstracts, his annual compendium of baseball data. However, James's ideas were slow to find widespread acceptance.

Bill James believed there was a widespread misunderstanding about how the game of baseball was played, claiming the sport was not defined by its rules but actually, as summarized by engineering professor Richard J. Puerzer, "defined by the conditions under which the game is played--specifically, the ballparks but also the players, the ethics, the strategies, the equipment, and the expectations of the public." Sabermetricians—sometimes considered baseball statisticians—began trying to replace the longtime favorite statistic known as the batting average. It has been claimed that team batting average provides a relatively poor fit for team runs scored. Sabermetric reasoning would say that runs win ballgames, and that a good measure of a player's worth is his ability to help his team score more runs than the opposing team.

Before Bill James popularized sabermetrics, Davey Johnson used an IBM System/360 at team owner Jerold Hoffberger's brewery to write a FORTRAN baseball computer simulation while playing for the Baltimore Orioles of Major League Baseball (MLB) in the early 1970s. He used his results in an unsuccessful attempt to promote to his manager Earl Weaver the idea that he should bat second in the lineup. He wrote IBM BASIC programs to help him manage the Tidewater Tides, and after becoming manager of the New York Mets in 1984, he arranged for a team employee to write a dBASE II application to compile and store advanced metrics on team statistics. Craig R. Wright was another employee in MLB, working with the Texas Rangers in the early 1980s. During his time with the Rangers, he became known as the first front office employee in MLB history to work under the title "sabermetrician".

David Smith founded Retrosheet in 1989, with the objective of computerizing the box score of every major league baseball game ever played, in order to more accurately collect and compare the statistics of the game.

The Oakland Athletics began to use a more quantitative approach to baseball by focusing on sabermetric principles in the 1990s. This initially began with Sandy Alderson as the general manager of the team when he used the principles toward obtaining relatively undervalued players. His ideas were continued when Billy Beane took over as general manager in 1997, a job he held until 2015, and hired his assistant Paul DePodesta. Through the statistical analysis done by Beane and DePodesta in the 2002 season, the Oakland A's went on to win 20 games in a row. This was a historic moment for the franchise, in which the 20th game was played at the Oakland–Alameda County Coliseum. His approaches to baseball soon gained national recognition when Michael Lewis published Moneyball: The Art of Winning an Unfair Game in 2003 to detail Beane's use of sabermetrics. In 2011, a film based on Lewis' book—also called Moneyball—was released and gave broad exposure to the techniques used in the Oakland Athletics' front office.

Traditional measurements 
Sabermetrics was created in an attempt for baseball fans to learn about the sport through objective evidence. This is performed by evaluating players in every aspect of the game, specifically batting, pitching, and fielding. These evaluation measures are usually phrased in terms of either runs or team wins as older statistics were deemed ineffective.

Batting measurements 

The traditional measure of batting performance is considered to be hits divided by the total number of at bats. Bill James, along with other fathers of sabermetrics, found this measure to be flawed, as it ignores any other way a batter can reach base besides a hit. Conversely, on-base percentage (OBP), takes base on balls ("walks") and hit-by-pitches into consideration. Another issue with the traditional measure of the batting average is that it does not distinguish between hits (i.e., singles, doubles, triples, and home runs) and gives each hit equal value. A measure that differentiates among these outcomes is the slugging percentage (SLG). To calculate the slugging percentage, the total bases of all hits is divided by the total number of times at bat. 

Stephen Jay Gould proposed that the disappearance of .400 batting average (last achieved in MLB by Ted Williams in 1941) is actually a sign of general improvement in batting. This is because, in the modern era, players are becoming more focused on hitting for power than for average. Therefore, it has become more valuable to compare players using the slugging percentage and on-base percentage over the batting average.

These two improved sabermetric measures are important skills to measure in a batter and have been combined to create the modern statistic on-base plus slugging (OPS). OPS is the sum of the on-base percentage and the slugging percentage. This modern statistic has become useful in comparing players and is a powerful method of predicting runs scored from a certain player.

Some of the other statistics that sabermetricians use to evaluate batting performance are weighted on-base average, secondary average, runs created, and equivalent average.

Pitching measurements 

The traditional measure of pitching performance is the earned run average (ERA). It is calculated as earned runs allowed per nine innings. Earned run average does not separate the ability of the pitcher from the abilities of the fielders that he plays with. Another classic measure for pitching is a pitcher's winning percentage. Winning percentage is calculated by dividing wins by the total number of decisions (wins plus losses). Winning percentage is also heavily dependent on the pitcher's team, particularly on the number of runs it scores.

Sabermetricians have attempted to find different measures of pitching performance that exclude the performances of the fielders involved. One of the earliest developed, and one of the most popular in use, is walks plus hits per inning pitched (WHIP), which while not completely defense-independent, tends to indicate how many times a pitcher is likely to put a player on base (either via walk, hit-by-pitch, or base hit) and thus how effective batters are against a particular pitcher in reaching base.

A later development was the creation of defense independent pitching statistics (DIPS) system. Voros McCracken has been credited with the development of this system in 1999. Through his research, McCracken was able to show that there is little to no difference between pitchers in the number of hits they allow on balls put into play—regardless of their skill level. Some examples of these statistics are defense-independent ERA, fielding independent pitching, and defense-independent component ERA. Other sabermetricians have furthered the work in DIPS, such as Tom Tango who runs the Tango on Baseball sabermetrics website.

Baseball Prospectus created another statistics called the peripheral ERA. This measure of a pitcher's performance takes hits, walks, home runs allowed, and strikeouts while adjusting for ballpark factors. Each ballpark has different dimensions when it comes to the outfield wall so a pitcher should not be measured the same for each of these parks.

Batting average on balls in play (BABIP) is another useful measurement for determining pitchers’ performance. When a pitcher has a high BABIP, they will often show improvements in the following season, while a pitcher with low BABIP will often show a decline in the following season. This is based on the statistical concept of regression to the mean. Others have created various means of attempting to quantify individual pitches based on characteristics of the pitch, as opposed to runs earned or balls hit.

Advanced methods 
Value over replacement player (VORP) was once considered a popular sabermetric statistic. This statistic demonstrates how much a player contributes to his team in comparison to a hypothetical player that performs at the minimum level needed to hold a roster position on a major league team. This measurement was invented by Keith Woolner, a former writer for the sabermetric group/website Baseball Prospectus.

Wins above replacement (WAR) is another popular sabermetric statistic for evaluating a player's contributions to his team. Similar to VORP, WAR compares a given player to a replacement-level player in order to determine the number of additional wins the player has provided to his team. WAR values vary with hitting positions and are largely determined by a player's successful performance and amount of playing time.

Quantitative analysis in baseball 
Many traditional and modern statistics, such as ERA and Wins Shared, don't give a full understanding of what is taking place on the field. Simple ratios are not sufficient to understand the statistical data of baseball. Structured quantitative analysis is capable of explaining many aspects of the game, for example, to examine how often a team should attempt to steal.

Applications 
Sabermetrics can be used for multiple purposes, but the most common are evaluating past performance and predicting future performance to determine a player's contributions to his team. These may be useful when determining who should win end-of-the-season awards such as MVP and when determining the value of making a certain trade.

Most baseball players tend to play a few years in the minor leagues before they are called up to the major league. The competitive differences coupled with ballpark effects make the exact comparison of a player's statistics a problem. Sabermetricians have been able to clear this problem by adjusting the player's minor league statistics, also known as the Minor-League Equivalency. Through these adjustments, teams are able to look at a player's performance in both AA and AAA to determine if he is fit to be called up to the majors.

Applied statistics 
Sabermetrics methods are generally used for three purposes:

 To compare key performances among certain specific players under realistic data conditions. The evaluation of past performance of a player enables an analytic overview. The comparison of this data between players can help one understand key points such as their market values. In that way, the role and the salary that should be given to that player can be defined.
 To provide prediction of future performance of a given player or a team. When past data is available about the performance of a team or a specific player, Sabermetrics can be used to predict the average future performances for the next season. Thus, a prediction can be made with a certain probability about the number of wins and losses.
 To provide a useful function of the player's contributions to his team. When analyzing data, one is able to understand the contributions a player makes to the success/failure of his team. Given that correlation, one can objectively sign or release players with certain characteristics.

Machine learning model

A machine learning model can be built using data sets available at sources such as baseball-reference. This model will give probability estimates for the outcome of specific games or the performance of particular players. These estimates are increasingly accurate when applied to a large number of events over a long term. The game outcome (win/lose) is treated as having a binomial distribution.

Predictions can be made using a logistic regression model with explanatory variables including: opponents' runs scored, runs scored, shutouts time at bat, winning rate, and pitcher whip.

Recent advances 
Many sabermetricians are still working hard to contribute to the field through creating new measures and asking new questions. Bill James' two Historical Baseball Abstract editions and Win Shares book have continued to advance the field of sabermetrics, 25 years after he helped start the movement. His former assistant Rob Neyer, who is now a senior writer at ESPN.com and national baseball editor of SBNation, also worked on popularizing sabermetrics since the mid-1980s.

Nate Silver, a former writer and managing partner of Baseball Prospectus, invented PECOTA. This acronym stands for Player Empirical Comparison and Optimization Test Algorithm, and is a sabermetric system for forecasting Major League Baseball player performance. Simply put, it assumes that the careers of similar players will follow a similar trajectory. This system has been owned by Baseball Prospectus since 2003 and helps the website's authors invent or improve widely relied-upon sabermetric measures and techniques.

Beginning in the 2007 baseball season, the MLB started looking at technology to record detailed information regarding each pitch that is thrown in a game. This became known as the PITCHf/x system which is able to record the speed of the pitch, at its release point and as it crossed the plate, as well as the location and angle of the break of certain pitches through video cameras. FanGraphs is a website that favors this system as well as the analysis of play-by-play data. The website also specializes in publishing advanced baseball statistics as well as graphics that evaluate and track the performance of players and teams.

In popular culture 
 Moneyball, the 2011 film about Billy Beane's use of sabermetrics to build the Oakland Athletics. The film is based on Michael Lewis's book of the same name.
 In the television show Numb3rs, the season 3 episode "Hardball" focuses on sabermetrics, and the season 1 episode "Sacrifice" also covers the subject.
 "MoneyBART", the third episode of The Simpsons 22nd season, in which Lisa utilizes sabermetrics to coach Bart's Little League Baseball team.

See also 

 Analytics (ice hockey), the ice hockey equivalent
 Advanced statistics in basketball, the basketball equivalent
 Fielding Bible Award
 Kyle Boddy, founder of Driveline Baseball
 Statcast
 The Hardball Times
 Theorycraft
 Total Baseball by John Thorn and Pete Palmer
 Whatever Happened to the Hall of Fame? by Bill James

Notes

References

External links 

 Society for American Baseball Research (SABR)

Baseball culture
Baseball statistics
Baseball strategy
Bill James
Sports science